"I Get Ideas" is a popular song which has been recorded by various musicians and used in a number of films and television episodes.

Origin

The music is a 1927 tango-canción (tango with lyrics) called "Adios, Muchachos", composed by Argentinian Julio César Sanders (often credited in the U.S. as "Lenny Sanders"). The English lyric (which has nothing to do with the original Spanish lyric by Cesar Felipe Vedani) is by Dorcas Cochran, and was published in 1951.

Notable recordings

The best-known version of the song was the recording by Tony Martin. It was recorded on April 16, 1951  and released by RCA Victor Records as catalog number 20-4141. It first reached the Billboard magazine charts on May 25, 1951 and lasted 30 weeks on the chart, peaking at #3.

The recording by Louis Armstrong was recorded on July 24, 1951 and released by Decca Records as catalog number 27720. It first reached the Billboard magazine charts on August 24, 1951 and lasted 16 weeks on the chart, peaking at #13. It was the flip side of "A Kiss to Build a Dream On."

The song was also recorded by Peggy Lee on May 16, 1951. It was released by Capitol Records as catalog number 1573.

Jane Morgan included the song on her album Jane in Spain (1959)

Bing Crosby and Rosemary Clooney recorded a duet of this song on 2 December 1964 with the Billy May Orchestra for their 1965 album That Travelin' Two-Beat.

Television and film appearances

"I Get Ideas" is sung by Desi Arnaz playing Ricky Ricardo on I Love Lucy in episode 31 "The Publicity Agent" first aired on May 12, 1952 and Lucille Ball sings the song as Lucy Ricardo in episode 130 of I Love Lucy, "Lucy and the Dummy" which was broadcast on October 17, 1955.

In The Muppet Show episode 1.02 aired on 12th of September 1976, Rita Moreno and a stereotypically "French looking" human-sized Muppet perform an Apache Dance to the tune of I get Ideas (or rather Adios, Muchachos).

As "Adios, Muchachos", the song is featured on the soundtracks of the 1992 movie Scent of a Woman and Woody Allen's 2006 movie, Scoop.

The melody is used extensively in the 1944 movie Together Again starring Irene Dunne and Charles Boyer. The song is also used in the 1937 movie History is Made at Night starring Charles Boyer and Jean Arthur.  The couple dances to it and refers to it as "our tango".

In the 1992 episode of Lovejoy entitled Smoke Your Nose, the vicar plays an arrangement for church organ, prompting Lovejoy and Lady Jane to dance a tango spontaneously in the church aisle.

In 1997, it was used on the soundtrack of The Full Monty.

"I Get Ideas" also appears on the soundtrack to the 1998 film The Impostors. The recording is credited to Elizabeth Bracco & Lewis J. Stadlen with Gary DeMichele & Band. It was used in part to reference its use in 1939's Another Thin Man during a protracted comic set piece.

M. Ward recorded an upbeat version of "I Get Ideas" for his 2012 album, A Wasteland Companion. Ward had been playing the song live for a couple of years prior to the release. This version was used in the second season episode of Girls, also titled "I Get Ideas"

The song is featured in the 2021 film Cruella.

References

1927 songs
Songs with lyrics by Dorcas Cochran
Tangos
Tango in the United States
Louis Armstrong songs